Grevillea exul is a species of flowering plant in the family Proteacae, endemic to New Caledonia.

It grows up to 10 metres in height and has narrow lanceolate to elliptic leaves which have a blunt apex. It is a manganese accumulator.

References

exul